A sieve is a tool to separate materials of one characteristic (for example, liquids) from materials of another (for example, solids).

Sieve may also refer to:

Places
 Sieve River in Italy

Computing
 Sieve (mail filtering language), a standard for specifying mail filters
 Scale-invariant feature transform (or SIFT), a computer vision algorithm that detects and describes local features in images
 Sieve C++ Parallel Programming System, an auto-parallelizing compiler for C++

Mathematics
 Sieve (category theory)
 Cyclic sieving, a phenomenon in combinatorics
 Sieve estimator (statistics and econometrics)
  Sieve theory, a technique for counting or filtering sets of numbers
 General number field sieve
 Large sieve
 Quadratic sieve
 Sieve of Atkin
 Sieve of Eratosthenes

Science and healthcare
 Sieve, in medicine, a "surgical sieve" refers to a very general list of diagnostic or pathological headings, against which any finding can be compared
 Sieving coefficient, used in transport phenomena, in chemistry
 Sieve tube element, an elongated cell in the phloem tissue of flowering plants

Tools
 Sieve, a firefighting tool used when a fire engine drafts water from a body of water; it is a large metal strainer is attached to the end of a hard suction hose that prevents debris from entering the hose
 Sieve, a gardening tool, known as a riddle, used to separate soil particles and provide a finer tilth, for example by removing stones and twigs
 Sieve, in plumbing, a stainless steel strainer

Other uses
 Sieve (hieroglyph), an ancient Egyptian hieroglyph
Sieve, or strainer, on rivers is a dangerous obstacle that water can pass through, but people cannot (see Obstacle in whitewater canoeing)
 Sieve, in sports such as hockey or lacrosse, is a common slang term used when referring to a goaltender who allows many or weak goals
 Sieve analysis, a practice or procedure used to assess the particle size distribution of a granular material, such as soil

See also
 CIV (band), a New York City punk rock band pronounced "sieve"